COVID-19 vaccination in Chad is an ongoing immunisation campaign against severe acute respiratory syndrome coronavirus 2 (SARS-CoV-2), the virus that causes coronavirus disease 2019 (COVID-19), in response to the ongoing pandemic in the country.

Chad began its vaccination program on 4 June 2021, initially after receiving 200,000 doses of the Sinopharm BIBP vaccine donated by China. As of 10 June 2021, 5,324 doses have been administered.

History

Timeline

June 2021 
Vaccinations started on 4 June, initially with 200,000 doses of the Sinopharm BIBP vaccine donated by China. By the end of the month 11,390 doses had been administered.

July 2021 
By the end of the month 26,511 doses had been administered.

August 2021 
By the end of the month 51,697 doses had been administered.

September 2021 
By the end of the month 130,369 doses had been administered.

October 2021 
By the end of the month 224,180 doses had been administered while 1% of the target population had been fully vaccinated.

November 2021 
By the end of the month 258,618 doses had been administered while 1% of the target population had been fully vaccinated.

December 2021 
By the end of the month 330,522 doses had been administered while 1% of the target population had been fully vaccinated.

January 2022 
By the end of the month 392,157 doses had been administered while 2% of the target population had been fully vaccinated.

February 2022 
By the end of the month 412,309 doses had been administered while 147,640 persons had been fully vaccinated.

March 2022 
By the end of the month 1,640,446 doses had been administered while 755,755 persons had been fully vaccinated.

April 2022 
By the end of the month 2,347,168 doses had been administered while 2,087,559 persons had been fully vaccinated.

Progress 
Cumulative vaccinations in Chad

References 

Chad
Vaccination
Chad